The 2001 Coppa Italia Final was the final of the 2000–01 Coppa Italia, the 54th season of the top cup competition in Italian football. The match was played over two legs on 24 May and 13 June 2001 between Parma and Fiorentina. This was Parma's fourth Coppa Italia final and Fiorentina's tenth. Parma had previously won the trophy twice and Fiorentina had done so on five occasions. The final was won by Fiorentina, who claimed their sixth Coppa Italia title with a 2–1 aggregate victory.

First leg

Summary 
The first leg was at Parma's home, the Stadio Ennio Tardini. It remained level for the vast majority of the 90 minutes, but it was ex-Tardini regular Paolo Vanoli who got the only goal of the game for Fiorentina with just minutes left on the clock. Two years earlier, the left-back had scored for Parma to help them to victory in the 1999 UEFA Cup Final.

Details

Second leg

Summary 
The second leg was back in Florence, where Fiorentina would be favourites to win and even stronger favourites to take the trophy because only a Parma win could deny them victory. A first-half Savo Milošević strike made the Viola nervous, but Nuno Gomes hit back for the home side half-way through the second half to put Fiorentina back in control of the tie and his side duly saw the game out and lifted the trophy.

Details 

Coppa Italia Finals
Coppa Italia Final 2001
Coppa Italia Final 2001
Coppa Italia Final